The Juréia Massif is an isolated group of mountains on the coast of the state of São Paulo, Brazil. The mountains hold a well-preserved remnant of Atlantic Forest, and are contained in the fully protected Juréia-Itatins Ecological Station.

Location

The name "Juréia" means prominent point in the Tupi-Guaraní language.
The Serra da Juréia is a Precambrian horst on the coast of the municipality of Iguape in the south of São Paulo state.
The eastern side falls steeply to the ocean.
It is an inselberg connected to the mainland by a sandy alluvial plain that was formed 5100 years ago during the post-glacial Cananéia Transgression, when the sea was about  higher than at present.
The Paranapu massif, part of the Serra dos Itatins, rises from the plain to the north.

Hydrology

The streams formed in the Serra da Juréia are clear, with a pH of 5–6.5, and are low in nutrients.
A few originate in springs in the campo, but most are rain-fed and intermittent.
Quiet streams may become torrential during times of heavy rainfall.
The Una do Prelado River, a blackwater river, meanders in a northeast direction through the plain between the Serra da Juréia and the Serra dos Itatins.
The Serra da Juréia is divided by the valley of the Rio Verde, which flows south to the ocean.

Environment

The climate is tropical humid with no dry season. 
At least  of rain falls in the driest month.
The Serra da Juréia and its surroundings hold one of the best preserved remnants of Atlantic Forest on the coast of São Paulo.
Above  the mountains are covered by campo vegetation - fields of grass, herbs and shrubs.
The slopes and base of the mountain are clothed in evergreen tropical forest.
There is a wide variety of species of flora, some rare.

Conservation

The Department of the Environment planned to develop a "green" housing project on the banks of the Rio Verde.
The project was cancelled in the 1980s when the Empresa Nuclebrás Brasileira decided to build the Iguape 4 and Iguape 5 power plants in a  area that included the entire Serra da Juréia.
By law, the area surrounding the nuclear power plant would have to be made an ecological station.
The power plant project was abandoned but the Juréia-Itatins Ecological Station was created on 20 January 1986, covering the Juréia Massif and the entire watershed of the Una do Prelado River.

Notes

Sources

Landforms of São Paulo (state)